Distress may refer to:
 Distress (medicine), an aversive state in which a person shows maladaptive behaviors
 Mental distress (or psychological distress)
 Distress, or distraint, the act of seizing goods to compel payment
 Distress (novel), a novel by Greg Egan
 Distress (1946 film), a 1946 French film
 Distress (1929 film), a 1929 French silent film
 Distress signal, an  recognized means for obtaining help
 Distressed inventory, goods or materials whose potential to be sold at a normal cost has passed
 Distressing, the process of making an object appear aged
 Stone washing, a similar technique used on apparel